People's Revolutionary Party is a name used by several political parties around the world:

 Kampuchean People's Revolutionary Party, now the Cambodian People's Party
 Ethiopian People's Revolutionary Party
 Lao People's Revolutionary Party
 Mongolian People's Revolutionary Party
 People's Revolutionary Party (Burma)
 People's Revolutionary Party (Chile)
 People's Revolutionary Party (South Korea) – see People's Revolutionary Party Incident
 People's Revolutionary Party (Vietnam)